Chartered Transport Planning Professional is a professional qualification for transport planners which has been developed by the Chartered Institution of Highways and Transportation and the Transport Planning Society. The professional qualification was given Chartered status in August 2019. It has been designed to provide professional recognition for transport planners at a level that equates to that of chartered engineer. The qualification requires candidates to have a range of technical competencies, provide a portfolio of evidence, and undertake a professional review.

The qualification is split into five sections:
 Knowledge and understanding of transport planning procedures and techniques
 Application of transport planning procedures and techniques
 Professional leadership
 Interpersonal skills
 Commitment and professional conduct

Those awarded transport planning professional status are entitled to use the  postnominal letters CTPP.

External links
 Official Chartered Institution of Highways and Transportation TPP web page
 Transport Planning Professional web site
 First Chartered Transport Planning Professionals news article
Educational qualifications in the United Kingdom
Professional titles and certifications
Transportation planning